Amīr Aṣlān Afshār (22 November 1919 – 18 February 2021) was an Iranian politician and diplomat.

Early life
He was a descendant of Afshar Qasemlu who ruled Kerman, during the reign of Nader Shah of the Afsharid dynasty. His father, Colonel Amir Masoud Afshar Qasemlu, served during Reza Shah's reign. He graduated from the Hindenburg-Oberrealschule Berlin-Wilmersdorf in 1939, and received his doctorate in political science from the University of Vienna in 1942.

Career
Afshār joined the Foreign Service in 1948. From 1950 to 1954, he was an attaché at the Iranian embassy in The Hague. From 1956 to 1960, he was a member of the National Consultative Assembly. In addition to his work as a member of parliament, he was a delegate to the United Nations Economic Committee from 1957 to 1961.

He later served as the Ambassador of Iran to Austria from 1967 to 1969, then as the Ambassador of Iran to the United States from 1969 to 1972, and the Ambassador of Iran to West Germany from 1973 to 1977.

On January 16, 1979, during the Iranian Revolution, Afshar left Iran on the same plane as Shah Mohammad Reza Pahlavi.

Death
On 18 February 2021, Afshār died from COVID-19 during the COVID-19 pandemic in France, at his home in Nice, aged 101.

Awards
 1965: Decoration of Honour for Services to the Republic of Austria

References

External links 

 Video: Nixon Meets Iranian Ambassador, aired on October 17, 1969, ABC News and AP News

1919 births
2021 deaths
Politicians from Tehran
University of Vienna alumni
Ambassadors of Iran to Austria
Ambassadors of Iran to the United States
Ambassadors of Iran to Germany
Iranian centenarians
Deaths from the COVID-19 pandemic in France
Iranian expatriates in France
Men centenarians